Lowell Wayne Beineke (born 1939) is a professor of graph theory at Purdue University Fort Wayne. Beineke is known for his elegant characterization of line graphs (derived graph) in terms of the nine Forbidden graph characterization.

Beineke has taught mathematics at Purdue University Fort Wayne since 1965. He received a B.S. from Purdue University in 1961 and an M.S. from the University of Michigan in 1962 and a Ph.D., in 1965, his Ph.D. advisor was Frank Harary. Beineke holds the Jack W. Schrey chair of mathematical sciences. Beineke was the recipient of the Amoco Foundation Outstanding Teaching Award in 1978, and again in 1992.

Books
 Selected topics in graph theory, LW Beineke, R. J. Wilson, 1978, Academic Press, New York

Research work

 Topological graph theory, AT White, LW Beineke, Selected Topics in Graph Theory, 1978
 "The thickness of the complete graph", LW Beineke, Frank Harary – Canadian Journal of Mathematics, 1965, books.google.com
 Tournaments, K. B. Reid, L. W. Beineke - Selected topics in graph theory, 1978
 "Characterizations of derived graphs", LW Beineke – J. Combin. Theory Ser. B, 1970

References

 
  Indiana University-Purdue University Fort Wayne

Graph theorists
Living people
University of Michigan alumni
Purdue University alumni
Indiana University – Purdue University Fort Wayne faculty
1939 births
Purdue University Fort Wayne faculty